Moore-Bick is a surname. Notable people with the surname include:
John Moore-Bick (born 1949), British Army officer
Martin Moore-Bick (born 1946), British judge

See also
Moore (surname)
Bick (disambiguation)

Compound surnames
English-language surnames
Surnames of English origin